The Madison Brooks incident involved the alleged sexual assault on Jan 15 2023 of 19-year old LSU college student Madison Brooks by four men in a car and her death later the same night after being struck by another vehicle.  Four suspects were arrested and charged with sexual assault following the incident.

References

2023 controversies